is a passenger railway station located in the city of Fujimino, Saitama, Japan, operated by the private railway operator Tōbu Railway.

Lines
Only Semi express and Local services stop at this station.

Station layout
The station consists of a single island platform serving two tracks. The elevated station building is located over the platform with exits on both east and west sides. Lifts were added to either side in 2009 and 2010.

This station has a season ticket sales office.

A storage siding is located to the west (Kawagoe direction) of the station between the up and down tracks, and this is used to stable trains during the daytime off peak.

Platforms

History

The station opened on 1 May 1914 coinciding with the opening of the Tōbu Tōjō Line from Ikebukuro.

In September 1967, the platforms were extended to accommodate eight-car trains, and the platforms were again extended in November 1976 to accommodate ten-car trains.

Through-running to and from  via the Tokyo Metro Fukutoshin Line commenced on 14 June 2008.

From 17 March 2012, station numbering was introduced on the Tōbu Tōjō Line, with Kami-Fukuoka Station becoming "TJ-19".

Passenger statistics
In fiscal 2019, the station was used by an average of 56,428 passengers daily. Passenger figures for previous years (boarding passengers only) are as shown below.

Accidents

On 14 January 2003 at 20:38, an unidentified passenger fell from the platform under the influence of alcohol and was killed by a passing train.

On 23 January 2006 at 12:55, a man jumped from the down platform in front of an approaching non-stop train travelling at approximately 90 km/h and was killed instantly.

On 18 October 2006 at 10:09, an unidentified person entered the No. 135 level crossing close to the station and was killed instantly by an approaching train travelling at approximately 85 km/h.

On 11 May 2007 at 11:29, a woman jumped from the platform in front of an approaching non-stop train travelling at approximately 95 km/h and was killed instantly.

On 30 July 2007 at 20:02, a man in his twenties sat down on the track in front of an approaching non-stop train (set 51001) travelling at approximately 80 km/h and was killed instantly.

On 1 November 2007 at 20:29, a 53-year-old woman jumped from the down platform in front of an approaching non-stop train travelling at approximately 90 km/h and was killed instantly.

On 7 July 2008 at 00:47, a 22-year-old woman sat down on the down track close to the No. 135 level crossing near the station and was killed instantly by an approaching train travelling at approximately 80 km/h.

On 4 September 2008 at 10:42, a 28-year-old woman was injured after jumping from the platform 5 metres in front of an approaching train travelling at approximately 40 km/h. The windscreen of the train was damaged.

Surrounding area

 Fujimino City Office
 Cocone Kamifukuoka Shopping Centre
 Chuo Park

See also
 List of railway stations in Japan
 Kamifukuoka, Saitama, the former name of the city in which the station is located

References

External links

 Tobu station information 

Tobu Tojo Main Line
Stations of Tobu Railway
Railway stations in Saitama Prefecture
Railway stations in Japan opened in 1914
Fujimino, Saitama